Medgyesi László (1892 in Budapest – ?) known in Paris and America as Ladislas Medgyes, was a Hungarian artist.

During the 1920s Medgyesi provided scenic design for many operetta, opera, and theatre productions in Paris, including the fully staged version of Aucassin et Nicolette. In 1927 Medgyes travelled to America and gave an exhibition of his paintings and also glass crystal sculptures.

References

1892 births
Year of death missing
Hungarian expatriates in France